BHPL may refer to:
Beverly Hills Public Library
Benton Harbor Public Library